Tacheocampylaea is a genus of air-breathing, land snails, terrestrial pulmonate gastropod mollusks in the subfamily Murellinae of the family Helicidae, the typical snails.

Species
Species within the genus Tacheocampylaea include:
 Tacheocampylaea acropachia (Mabille, 1880)
 Tacheocampylaea carotii (Paulucci, 1882)
 Tacheocampylaea cyrniaca (Dutailly, 1867)
 † Tacheocampylaea fabarensis (Tuccimei, 1889)
 Tacheocampylaea insularis (Crosse & Debeaux, 1869)
 Tacheocampylaea raspailii (Payraudeau, 1826)
 Tacheocampylaea romagnolii (Dutailly, 1867)
 Tacheocampylaea tacheoides (Pollonera, 1909)
Synonyms
 †Tacheocampylaea (Mesodontopsis) Pilsbry, 1895: synonym of † Mesodontopsis Pilsbry, 1895

References

External links
 Pfeiffer, L. (1877). Ueber die systematische Anordnung der Helicaceen. Malakozoologische Blätter. 24(1): 1–14

 
Helicidae
Gastropod genera
Taxonomy articles created by Polbot